William Redfern (1774 – 17 July 1833) was an English-raised surgeon in early colonial Australia who was transported to New South Wales as a convict for his role in the mutiny on the Nore. He is widely regarded as the "father of Australian medicine".

Early life
Redfern was born in County Antrim and raised in Trowbridge, Wiltshire, England. He was surgeon's apprentice to his older brother Thomas and passed the examination of the London Company of Surgeons in 1797. He was commissioned as a surgeon's mate aboard the 64-gun .

Mutiny
Redfern was aboard Standard in 1797 when the crew rose against the officers in the Nore mutiny. For his actions Redfern was sentenced to death, however, the court "recommended mercy on account of his professional situation" and his sentence was commuted to life imprisonment. According to a letter written by Lachlan Macquarie, Redfern requested transportation to New South Wales. After spending four years in English jails he was transported in 1801.

Career on Norfolk Island
Redfern was granted a conditional pardon following his arrival in Sydney and was transferred to Norfolk Island as assistant surgeon to that newly established colony. On 19 June 1803 he received a full pardon from the colony's governor, Philip Gidley King, but remained on Norfolk Island in his previous role. He remained on the island as assistant surgeon from May 1802 to 1808, when he returned to Sydney.

Career in New South Wales
As early as 1804 Redfern began advocating for the use of a new smallpox vaccine. After an examination of his level of medical knowledge by the Surgeon-General of New South Wales, Thomas Jamison, it was certified that Redfern was "qualified to exercise the profession of a surgeon, etc". In 1808 he returned to Sydney and was appointed by Governor Joseph Foveaux to the role of assistant surgeon for the new Sydney Hospital. Foveaux planned to confirm Redfern's appointment and stated that his "skill and ability in his profession are unquestionable, and his conduct has been such as to deserve particular approbation".

Redfern's status was further enhanced following the arrival of Governor Lachlan Macquarie in 1810. Macquarie was keen to rehabilitate emancipated convicts, noting that "emancipation, when united with rectitude and long-tried good conduct, should lead a man back to that rank in society which he had forfeited". Few among the emancipated convicts were suitable for this elevation, with Macquarie observing that he had "admitted only four men of that class to his table", of whom Redfern was one. In 1814 Redfern reported to Macquarie on the sanitary problems of the ships transporting convicts to New South Wales. As a result of this report the conditions were greatly improved. In 1817 he became one of the founders of the Bank of New South Wales. In 1811, he married Sarah Spencer Wills.

Redfern had expected to succeed D'Arcy Wentworth as principal surgeon; Macquarie recommended him for the position in 1818 — however it was given to James Bowman in 1819. Redfern immediately resigned from the Colonial Medical Service and later in the same year Macquarie made him a magistrate, but this was objected to by Commissioner Bigge and the appointment was not sanctioned. Redfern had a large private practice as a physician, and though somewhat brusque in manner was much liked and trusted; he became the "best" and "best-known" surgeon in Sydney. He visited England in 1821 as a delegate for the emancipists endeavouring to obtain relief from legal restrictions arising from a court decision in London, which came in the form of the New South Wales Act 1823, allowing ownership of property and "personal action at law" for those who served their sentence in New South Wales and were no longer prisoners. In January 1824 he was at the island of Madeira for the benefit of his health. His wife, who was then in London, made application on his behalf for an additional grant of land, which was allowed. He was evidently then in good circumstances. In 1826 he retired from practising as a physician, and for about two years engaged in scientific farming, which had been a hobby of his for some time.

Death

He went to Edinburgh about the end of 1828 to bring his son, William Lachlan Macquarie Redfern, there for education, and he died there towards the close of July 1833.

Legacy

The suburb of Redfern, New South Wales is named after him, as it developed on land that he once owned.

A comprehensive two volume biography by Arthur Jones was published in 2019.

See also
List of convicts transported to Australia

References

External links 
 Primary document transcripts

1774 births
1833 deaths
19th-century Australian medical doctors
Convicts transported to Australia
People from Trowbridge
Settlers of New South Wales